, also known as  is a Japanese landscape garden and nationally designated Place of Scenic Beauty in the city of Kuroishi, Aomori Prefecture, Japan.

Overview
This garden was laid out in the late Meiji period Katō Uehei, a weathly local businessman and politician, and was initially intended as a work of charity to provide employment to impoverished local farmers. It was designed by Takahashi Teizan, the leading gardener of the Oishi Bugaku Ryu style of Japanese gardens in 1882 and was completed by two of his pupils in 1902. The garden consists of a large pond on the left hand side of the main building with a complex  stone-structured shoreline. Stepping stones extend from the main building in two directions, and the garden is studded with large megaliths, including a large conical mound intended to emulate Mount Iwaki and several stone Tōrō (Japanese lanterns).

On the west side of the garden is the former Katō family residence, which consists of a main house and a detached tea room, which were constructed in 1902. The garden remained in private hands until it was donated to Kuroishi city in November 2019.

The gardens are about an eight minute walk from Kuroishi Station on the Kōnan Line.

See also
 List of Places of Scenic Beauty of Japan (Aomori)

References

External links
 Aomori Prefectural Government 
 Kuroishi City site 
Kuroishi Tourist Association 

Gardens in Aomori Prefecture
Places of Scenic Beauty
Kuroishi, Aomori